Milen Dobrev (February 22, 1980 — March 21, 2015) was a Bulgarian weightlifter. He became Olympic champion in 2004 in the middle heavyweight class. That same year, he won the European Championship in Kyiv. Dobrev died of a heart attack in his home in Plovdiv in 2015. He is the first Bulgarian to win an Olympic title in weightlifting as a member of a team from Plovdiv (Maritsa-Olimp). After winning the 2001 Brisbane Goodwill Games in Australia, he established himself as the elite of weightlifters. His world title was from Vancouver, Canada, in 2003. He also became European champion in 2003 in Loutraki, Greece, and in 2004 in Kyiv, Ukraine.

Dobrev started training weightlifting in 1991 under the coach Georgi Yotovski, when he was in sixth grade at the Vasil Levski Sports School and competed for the team of Maritsa. During his military service (1999 – 2000), he was part of the team of CSKA. After 2001 Dobrev transferred to the team of Maritsa-Olimp and started training under Krastyo Milev. He became part of the extended men’s national team on 11.02.2001 and made his debut at the European Men’s Championship in Trencin, Slovakia. In 2001 he also made a debut at the 2001 World Championship in Antalya, Turkey, winning his first bronze medal in the 85 kg category. In 2002 he won silver medal at the European Championship in Antalya, Turkey, in the 94 kg category. The same year, Dobrev also became second at the World Championship in Warsaw, Poland.

Milen Dobrev has been an honorary citizen of Plovdiv since 2004. On 20.04.2005 at a ceremony in the Greek Embassy in Sofia, Bulgaria, he was also named honorary citizen of Athens, Greece.

Major Results

References

External links

1980 births
Bulgarian male weightlifters
Weightlifters at the 2004 Summer Olympics
Olympic gold medalists for Bulgaria
2015 deaths
Olympic medalists in weightlifting
Sportspeople from Plovdiv
Medalists at the 2004 Summer Olympics
Goodwill Games medalists in weightlifting
European Weightlifting Championships medalists
World Weightlifting Championships medalists
Competitors at the 2001 Goodwill Games
20th-century Bulgarian people
21st-century Bulgarian people